Camden County is a county located in the U.S. state of New Jersey. Its county seat is Camden. As of the 2020 census, the county was the state's ninth-most populous county, with a population of 523,485, its highest decennial count ever and an increase of 9,828 (+1.9%) from the 2010 census count of 513,657, which in turn reflected an increase of 4,725 (0.9%) from the 508,932 counted in the 2000 census. 

The county borders Philadelphia, the nation's sixth-most populous city, to its northwest.

The county was formed on March 13, 1844, from portions of Gloucester County. The county was named for Charles Pratt, 1st Earl Camden, a British judge, civil libertarian, and defender of the American cause. Camden County is part of the Philadelphia-Camden-Wilmington PA-NJ-DE-MD metropolitan statistical area, also known as the Delaware Valley. The county is part of the South Jersey region of the state.

Geography and climate
Located in a coastal/alluvial plain, the county is uniformly flat and low-lying. The low point is sea level, along the Delaware River.

Climate and weather

The county has a humid subtropical climate (Cfa). Average monthly temperatures in Chesilhurst range from 33.1 °F in January to 76.4 °F in July.

Demographics

With the merger of Pine Valley into Pine Hill in January 2022, Camden County has 36 municipalities of diverse sizes and populations. Nine are less than one square mile in area, and five have fewer than 2,000 residents (excluding Tavistock which is a golf course community with nominal populations). In 2020, a majority of county residents live in five municipalities having populations over 30,000: Cherry Hill (74,553), Camden (71,791), Gloucester Township (66,034), Winslow (39,097) and Pennsauken (37,034).

The 2018 American Community Survey estimated show 25 municipalities with poverty rates below the statewide average (10.5%).  Nine municipalities had poverty rates higher than the county-wide estimate (12.6%):  Camden, Woodlynne, Chesilhurst, Lawnside, Bellmawr, Clementon, Blackwood, Brooklawn, and Lindenwold.  Additionally, Cherry Hill and Voorhees are affluent areas with higher-poverty areas including Echelon and Ellisburg.

2020 Census
As of the 2020 U.S. census, the county had 523,485 people, 187,780 households, and 125,806 families. The county's racial makeup was 56.0% White, 19.3% African American, 0.47% Native American, 6.22% Asian, and 8.14% from two or more races. Hispanic or Latino of any race were 18.2% of the population.

There were 187,780 households, of which 29.3% had children under the age of 18 living with them, 59.0% were married couples living together, 25.3% had a female householder with no husband present, 9.2% had a male householder with no wife present and 29.4% were non-families. 38.7% of all households were made up of individuals, and 11.0% had someone living alone who was 65 years of age or older. The average household size was 2.66 and the average family size was 3.30.

About 22.5% of the county's population was under age 18, 8.1% was from age 18 to 24, 38.7% was from age 15 to 44, and 16.1% was age 65 or older. The median age was 38.7 years. The gender makeup of the city was 48.3% male and 51.7% female. For every 100 females, there were 93.4 males.

The county's median household income was $73,672, and the median family income was $88,575. About 10.7% of the population were below the poverty line, including 17.4% of those under age 18 and 9.0% of those age 65 or over.

2010 Census

Economy

Based on data from the Bureau of Economic Analysis, Camden County had a gross domestic product (GDP) of $23.8 billion in 2018, which was ranked 11th in New Jersey and represented an increase of 2.5% from the previous year.

Government

County government
The county is governed by the Camden County Board of County Commissioners comprised of seven members chosen at-large in partisan elections for three-year terms on a staggered basis by the residents of the county, with either two or three seats up for election each year as part of the November general election. At a reorganization meeting held in January after each election, the newly constituted Board of Commissioners selects one of its members to serve as director and another as deputy director. In 2016, freeholders were paid $23,000 and the freeholder director was paid an annual salary of $24,000.

, Camden County's Commissioners are 
Commissioner Director Louis Cappelli Jr. (D, Collingswood, term as commissioner and as director ends December 31, 2023), 
Commissioner Deputy Director Edward T. McDonnell (D, Pennsauken Township, term as commissioner ends 2025; term as deputy director ends 2023), 
Virginia Ruiz Betteridge (D, Runnemede, 2025),
Almar Dyer (D, Pennsauken Township, 2024), 
Melinda Kane (D, Cherry Hill, 2024), 
Jeffrey L. Nash (D, Winslow Township, 2024), and 
Jonathan L. Young Sr. (D, Berlin Township, 2023). 

Camden County's constitutional officers, all elected directly by voters, are 
County Clerk Joseph Ripa (D, Voorhees Township, 2024),
Sheriff Gilbert "Whip" Wilson (D, Camden, 2024) and 
Surrogate Michelle Gentek-Mayer (D, Gloucester Township, 2025).

Pursuant to Article VII Section II of the New Jersey State Constitution, each county in New Jersey is required to have three elected administrative officials known as "constitutional officers." These officers are the County Clerk and County Surrogate (both elected for five-year terms of office) and the County Sheriff (elected for a three-year term). Camden County's constitutional officers, all elected directly by voters, are:

The County Prosecutor is Grace C. MacAulay, who was sworn into office in January 2022. Camden County constitutes Vicinage 4 of the New Jersey Superior Court, which is seated at the Camden County Hall of Justice in Camden, with additional facilities at various locations in Cherry Hill. The Assignment Judge for the vicinage is Deborah Silverman Katz. As with most counties in the state, the court system in Camden County also includes municipal courts for each township, borough and city to handle traffic and other minor items. Law enforcement at the county level, in addition to a sheriff, includes the Camden County Police Department and the Camden County Prosecutor's Office. The Camden Police Department and the Camden County Park Police were absorbed into the newly formed Camden County Police Department in 2013.

In March 2019, Melinda Kane was appointed to fill the seat expiring in December 2021 that had been held by Bill Moen, who resigned from office to run for a seat in the New Jersey General Assembly. Kane served on an interim basis until the November 2019 general election, when she was elected to serve the balance of the term of office.

Federal representatives 
Camden County is entirely within the 1st congressional district.

State representatives

Politics

|}
Camden County has long been a Democratic stronghold, and almost all of the county is in the 1st congressional district. The county usually votes overwhelmingly Democratic in national, state, and local elections. As of August 1, 2020, there were a total of 376,429 registered voters in Camden County, of whom 178,834 (47.5%) were registered as Democrats, 57,545 (15.3%) were registered as Republicans and 134,908 (35.8%) were registered as Unaffiliated. There were 5,142 (1.4%) voters registered to other parties. Among the county's 2010 Census population, 69.1% were registered to vote, including 75.6% of those ages 18 and over.

In the 2020 United States presidential election, Joe Biden won the county by 33.4%. In the 2016 United States presidential election, Hillary Clinton carried the county by a 32.4% margin over Donald Trump, winning New Jersey by 14.1%. In the 2012 United States presidential election, Barack Obama carried the county by 37.2%, an increase over the margin he carried the county over John McCain in the 2008 United States presidential election. He won by 34.8% while having only won New Jersey by 15.5%.

In the 2009 gubernatorial election, Republican Chris Christie received 39.29% of the vote (52,337 votes) to incumbent Democratic Governor Jon Corzine's 54.93% (73,171 votes), while Independent Chris Daggett received 4.63% of the vote (6,166 votes). In the 2013 gubernatorial election Republican Governor Chris Christie received 54.8% of the vote (64,545 votes) to Democrat Barbara Buono's 43.7% (51,546 votes). In the 2017 gubernatorial election, Republican Kim Guadagno received 37,113 (30.7%) of the vote, and Democrat Phil Murphy received 81,268 (67.2%) of the vote. In the 2021 gubernatorial election, Republican Jack Ciattarelli received 37.5% of the vote (56,016 ballots cast) to Democrat Phil Murphy's 61.7% (92,162 votes).

Municipalities 

The 36 municipalities in Camden County and the 2010 census data for population, housing units, and area are:

Historical municipalities
Defunct municipalities in the county (with years of formation and dissolution listed in parentheses) include:
 Centre Township (1855–1926)
 Clementon Township (1903–1941)
 Delaware Township (renamed as Cherry Hill)
 Newton Township (1695–1871)
 Stockton Township (1859–1899)
 Union Township (1831–1868)
 Pine Valley (1929-2022) - In 2021, Pine Valley finalized plans to merge with the adjacent Borough of Pine Hill, dissolving the Pine Valley borough government completely by the end of 2021. Pine Hill gained $20 million in taxable property and the famed golf club. The merger was completed January 1, 2022.

Education

Colleges and universities
Rutgers University-Camden is located in the downtown/waterfront district of Camden, and dates back to 1926 with the founding of the South Jersey Law School.

Rutgers School of Law–Camden is one of two campuses of Rutgers Law School, the other being in Newark.

The Rowan-Virtua School of Osteopathic Medicine is located in Stratford and dates to 1976. It is the state's only osteopathic medical school and was South Jersey's first four-year college of medicine.

The Cooper Medical School of Rowan University is located in the downtown/university district of Camden. Established as a four-year medical school in 1975, the relationship with Rowan University was formed in 2008.

Rutgers Biomedical and Health Sciences has a campus in Stratford which hosts its dental school and school of public health.

Rowan University at Camden is located on Cooper Street in Camden and offers undergraduate and graduate degrees.

Camden County College is a two-year public community college serving students from Camden County. The school has campuses in Blackwood, Camden and Cherry Hill, and was founded in 1967.

Primary and secondary education
The county has the following school districts:

K-12

Audubon School District
Camden City School District
Cherry Hill Public Schools
Collingswood Public Schools
Gloucester City Public Schools
Haddon Heights School District
Haddon Township School District
Haddonfield Public Schools
Lindenwold Public Schools
Pennsauken Public Schools
Pine Hill Schools
Winslow Township School District

Secondary (9-12)
Black Horse Pike Regional School District
Camden County Technical Schools
Eastern Camden County Regional High School District
Sterling High School

Elementary (K-8, except as indicated)

Barrington Public Schools
Bellmawr School District
Berlin Borough School District
Berlin Township Public Schools
Brooklawn Public School District
Chesilhurst Borough School District (K-6)
Clementon School District
Gibbsboro School District
Gloucester Township Public Schools
Laurel Springs School District (K-6)
Lawnside School District
Magnolia School District
Merchantville School District
Mount Ephraim Public Schools
Oaklyn Public School District (K-5)
Runnemede Public School District
Somerdale School District
Stratford School District
Voorhees Township Public Schools
Waterford Township School District (K-6)
Woodlynne School District

Roman Catholic Diocese of Camden operates area Catholic schools.

Arts and culture

Fine and performing arts
The Ritz Theater in Haddon Township, constructed in 1927 and listed on the National Register of Historic Places, hosts theater performances and film festivals.

Symphony in C was established as The Haddonfield Symphony in 1952 and is based on the campus of Rutgers University-Camden.

Perkins Center for the Arts has locations in Moorestown and Collingswood.

The Scottish Rite Auditorium in Collingswood, recognized on the American Institute of Architects's list of "150 Best Buildings and Places" in New Jersey, hosts national music and theater performances.

Wineries, breweries, cideries and distilleries
 Amalthea Cellars (located in the West Atco portion of Winslow Township)
 Devil's Creek Brewery (Collingswood)
 Tonewood Brewing (Oaklyn)
 Flying Fish Brewing (headquartered in Somerdale)
 Sharrott Winery (located in the Blue Anchor section of Winslow Township)
 Armageddon Brewing (Somerdale)

National protected area
 Great Egg Harbor Scenic and Recreational River (part)

Writers and poets
Poet Walt Whitman lived in Camden County.
Matthew Quick's novel The Silver Linings Playbook is set in Collingswood and Voorhees Township, although the screen adaptation is set in Pennsylvania.
Poet Nick Virgilio was born in Camden and returned to Camden in 1958.

In films
The Last Broadcast was partially filmed in the Pine Barrens.
Harold & Kumar Go to White Castle is partially set in Cherry Hill.
Camden was the setting for several scenes in 12 Monkeys.

Transportation

Roads and highways
Camden County hosts numerous county, state, U.S., and Interstates.

Major county roads that pass through include County Road 534, County Road 536, County Road 537, County Road 543, County Road 544, County Road 551 and County Road 561.

State routes that pass through are Route 38, Route 41, Route 42 (the North-South Freeway), Route 47 (only in Brooklawn), Route 70, Route 73, Route 90 (the Betsy Ross Bridge), Route 143 (only in Winslow), Route 154 (only in Cherry Hill) and Route 168.

U.S. Routes that traverse are U.S. Route 30 and U.S. Route 130. The interstates that pass through are Interstate 76 (part of the North-South Freeway and the Walt Whitman Bridge), Interstate 295 and Interstate 676 (part of the North-South Freeway and the Ben Franklin Bridge (which is multiplexed with US 30)).

Other limited access roads that pass through are the Atlantic City Expressway and the New Jersey Turnpike. There are five ACE interchanges that are within the county borders: Exits 44 (at NJ 42), 41 (at Berlin-Cross Keys Road / CR 689), 38 (at Williamstown-New Freedom Road / CR 536 Spur), 33 (connecting to NJ 73) and 31 (at NJ 73). The only turnpike interchange that is in the county is Exit 3 at the border of Runnemede and Bellmawr.

Public transportation
NJ Transit has stations along the Atlantic City Line in Pennsauken, Cherry Hill, Lindenwold and Atco in Waterford Township, connecting Philadelphia to Atlantic City along the former Pennsylvania-Reading Seashore Lines main line.

The River Line is a diesel tram-train light-rail system operated for NJ Transit by the Southern New Jersey Rail Group on a former Pennsylvania Railroad line from Trenton. Most stations in the county are in the Camden, including the Walter Rand Transportation Center, except for the 36th Street, Pennsauken Transit Center and Pennsauken–Route 73 station located in Pennsauken Township.

The PATCO Speedline, owned by the Delaware River Port Authority, runs a rapid transit line across the Ben Franklin Bridge from Philadelphia through Camden to the PRSL main right-of-way between Haddonfield and its eastern terminus in Lindenwold. Suburban station stops include Woodcrest, Westmont and Collingswood.

NJ Transit provides commuter and long-distance bus service from many locations in the county to Philadelphia, with additional service to Atlantic City. Extensive local service is offered within the county, including routes to Camden and area train and light rail stations.

See also
 
 
 National Register of Historic Places listings in Camden County, New Jersey

References

Further reading
 History of Camden County in the Great War, 1917–1918 Camden, NJ: Publicity and Historical Committee, 1919.

External links

 Official website
 Camden County Historic Photos, Part I (Audubon, New Jersey to Camden, New Jersey)
 Camden County Historic Photos, Part II (Cherry Hill, New Jersey to Haddon Township, New Jersey)
 Camden County Historic Photos, Part III (Haddonfield, New Jersey to Pennsauken Township, New Jersey)
 Camden County Historic Photos, Part IV (Pine Hill, New Jersey to Woodlynne, New Jersey)
 Camden County Historical Society

 
1844 establishments in New Jersey
Geography of the Pine Barrens (New Jersey)
Populated places established in 1844
South Jersey